Cudjoe Key is a census-designated place and unincorporated community in Monroe County, Florida, United States, on an island of the same name in the lower Florida Keys. As of the 2020 census, the CDP had a population of 2,019, up from 1,763 in 2010.

History

Toponymy
The island was called "Littleton Island" in 1772. The name changed to Cudjoe's by 1849, later shortened to Cudjoe. It may have been named for the Joewood or Cudjoe wood tree (Jacquinia keyensis) which grows on the island. John Viele notes that "Cudjoe" is an Akan name, and may have been the name of an escaped slave who lived on the island early in the 19th century.

20th century
The United States Army activated Cudjoe Key Air Force Station in 1959 to track missiles traveling through the Eglin Gulf Test Range. The Air Force took over operations the following year, and it subsequently became a detached installation of Homestead Joint Air Reserve Base.

21st century
The air force station flies a white radar aerostat, known locally as "Fat Albert", which is used for drug interdiction missions by the Drug Enforcement Administration. On April 20, 2007, a Cessna 182 crashed after its left wing struck the tether anchoring "Fat Albert". The aerostat is marked on air navigation charts inside a restricted area that contains the warning, "Caution: Unmarked balloon on cable to 14,000 [feet]."

On September 10, 2017, Cudjoe Key suffered a direct hit from Hurricane Irma which made landfall as a Category 4 hurricane.

Geography
Cudjoe Key is located in the Florida Keys at  (24.664298, -81.482339). U.S. 1 (or the Overseas Highway) crosses the key at about mile markers 20.5 – 23, between Summerland and Sugarloaf Keys.

The water area includes Cudjoe Bay to the south of the island, a portion of Kemp Channel to the east, and tidal water to the northwest between Cudjoe Key and small islands known as the Rattlesnake Lumps.

Demographics

As of the census of 2000, there were 1,695 people, 799 households, and 541 families residing in the CDP.  The population density was 124.9/km2 (323.6/mi2).  There were 1,482 housing units at an average density of 109.2/km2 (282.9/mi2).  The racial makeup of the CDP was 96.22% White, 0.88% African American, 0.47% Native American, 0.88% Asian, 0.12% Pacific Islander, 0.71% from other races, and 0.71% from two or more races. Hispanic or Latino of any race were 5.66% of the population.

There were 799 households, out of which 15.6% had children under the age of 18 living with them, 62.0% were married couples living together, 3.4% had a female householder with no husband present, and 32.2% were non-families. 21.7% of all households were made up of individuals, and 7.8% had someone living alone who was 65 years of age or older.  The average household size was 2.12 and the average family size was 2.43.

In the CDP, the population was spread out, with 12.2% under the age of 18, 3.7% from 18 to 24, 27.1% from 25 to 44, 38.8% from 45 to 64, and 18.2% who were 65 years of age or older.  The median age was 48 years. For every 100 females, there were 108.2 males.  For every 100 females age 18 and over, there were 109.4 males.

The median income for a household in the CDP was $57,500, and the median income for a family was $59,883. Males had a median income of $36,094 versus $31,250 for females. The per capita income for the CDP was $27,085.  About 4.4% of families and 5.8% of the population were below the poverty line, including 5.7% of those under age 18 and 5.4% of those age 65 or over.

References

Unincorporated communities in Monroe County, Florida
Census-designated places in Monroe County, Florida
Suburbs of Key West
Census-designated places in Florida
Unincorporated communities in Florida
Populated coastal places in Florida on the Atlantic Ocean